Ihor Snitko (Ігор Снітко, also spelled Igor Snitko, born 13 August 1978) is a freestyle swimmer from Ukraine, who was a specialist in the long-distance events. He won the silver medal in the men's 1500 m freestyle event at the 1997 European Championships in Seville, Spain, followed by the gold medal two years later in Istanbul. He represented his native country at two consecutive Summer Olympics, starting in Atlanta, Georgia (1996).

Snitko was born in Kharkiv, Ukraine.

References

External links 
 

1978 births
Living people
Ukrainian male swimmers
Ukrainian male freestyle swimmers
Olympic swimmers of Ukraine
Swimmers at the 1996 Summer Olympics
Swimmers at the 2000 Summer Olympics
European Aquatics Championships medalists in swimming
Universiade medalists in swimming
Universiade gold medalists for Ukraine
Medalists at the 2001 Summer Universiade
Sportspeople from Kharkiv